Ronald Lapin (1941–May 16, 1995) was an Israeli-born American surgeon, best known as a "bloodless surgeon" due to his willingness to perform surgeries on severely anemic Jehovah's Witness patients without the use of blood transfusions. He completed medical school in New York City and established his practice in Orange County, CA, in the 1970s, where he lived until his death.

He pioneered the use of the electric scalpel in such cases, which reduces blood loss during surgery. He promoted and taught the use of this and other techniques that make bloodless surgery successful.

Lapin became interested in bloodless surgery in the mid-1970s, while practicing his profession in Orange County, CA. He was approached by a severely anemic Jehovah's Witness in need of surgery (who, due to religious beliefs, could not accept a blood transfusion). During this first operation on a Witness patient, Lapin secured the help of the anesthesiologist by assuring him that the blood needed for the operation was "on its way". After successfully performing that first surgery without the use of any transfused blood, Witnesses who heard of his rare cooperation came to him for help with their surgical needs. Thus was born his practice dedicated to providing bloodless surgery for Jehovah's Witness patients from around the world.

He founded several bloodless surgery centers in Southern California, including hospitals in Norwalk, Bellflower, and Fountain Valley, and became a tireless advocate of non-blood medical management.

In 1980, Lapin was chosen by a Japanese pharmaceutical firm to operate on Jehovah's Witness patients, with conditional FDA approval, using Fluosol DA, an "artificial blood" substitute. The unique oxygen-carrying properties of the product were the subject of a segment on the ABC television program "That's Incredible!". During the show, one of Lapin's patients, Donna Graham of Winchester, CA, was shown recovering from an emergency hysterectomy, having received approval for a transfusion of the "artificial blood" due to extreme loss of blood prior to admission. An unusual stunt on the program showed a mouse being immersed in the product, and yet, due to its blood being oxygenated via the fluid, it did not drown. After a tabloid newspaper accused the show of hiding the later death of the mouse, the stunt was repeated on another segment of the program.

For publicly challenging conventional medical practices, which Lapin derided as substandard and unacceptable, he experienced persecution in the form of legal attacks and even sabotage. His story is recounted in the Gene Church biography No Man's Blood.

Although Lapin's early advocacy of bloodless surgery was viewed as radical at the time, the outbreak of blood-borne AIDS infections helped the cause, and throughout the world today many hospitals gladly accept Jehovah's Witness patients who have low hemoglobin counts for a full array of procedures. Thanks in part to his efforts, surgeons routinely perform successful bloodless operations for all types of medical problems, from open heart surgery to hip replacement. There are even hospitals that openly seek such business; one such facility is Englewood Hospital and Medical Center in Englewood, New Jersey. It was recently awarded a federal grant of almost $4.7 million to teach bloodless surgery techniques to army surgeons.

An unusual twist in his story came in the late 1980s, when allegations of rape and the bitter divorce from his wife were reported in tabloid fashion in the Orange County and Los Angeles newspapers. He was later exonerated of the rape allegations.

References

American surgeons
1995 deaths
1941 births
Monmouth University alumni
20th-century American physicians
20th-century surgeons